Allerford is a village in the county of Somerset, England, located within Exmoor National Park, and is part of the parish of Selworthy in the district of Somerset West and Taunton. It appears in Domesday Book as "Alresford – forda Ralph de Limesy Mill".

The parish was part of the hundred of Carhampton.

One of the village's main attractions is the much-photographed packhorse bridge. Built as a crossing over the River Aller (from which the village gets its name), it is thought to be medieval in origin. Nearby is the New Bridge where the A39 road crosses Horner Water. The packhorse bridge is an Ancient monument and has been added to the Heritage at Risk Register.<ref></</ref>

Allerford New Bridge which carries the A39 road past the village is also a Scheduled Ancient Monument and Grade II* listed building. It is also on the Heritage at Risk register because of the risks of vehicle damage and erosion.

The village is also home to Allerford House, childhood home of Admiral John Moresby, who explored the coastline of New Guinea and for whom Port Moresby, the capital city of Papua New Guinea, was named. Other traditional sights in the village include thatched cottages, a forge and an old-fashioned red telephone box. There is also a Reading Room, built by the Acland family to foster adult education.

One of the thatched cottages operated as the local Primary School between 1821 and 1981 and is now a museum containing the West Somerset Rural Life Museum and Victorian School. The museum houses the West Somerset Photographic Archive.

References

External links

Allerford Museum & West Somerset Rural Life Museum

Villages in West Somerset
Exmoor
Structures on the Heritage at Risk register in Somerset
Scheduled monuments in West Somerset